Anna Catherine Parnell (13 May 1852 – 20 September 1911) was an Irish nationalist and leader of the Ladies' Land League. Irish Nationalist leader Charles Stewart Parnell was her older brother.

Early life 
Anna was born Catherine Maria Anna Mercer Parnell at Avondale House in Rathdrum, County Wicklow, Ireland on 13 May 1852. The tenth of eleven children of John Henry Parnell, a landlord and Delia Tudor Stewart Parnell, an Irish-American and the daughter of Admiral Charles Stewart (1778–1869) of the US Navy.  She had very little formal education as a child but the family had an extensive library which she was encouraged to read by her mother. After her father died in 1859 Anna moved with the family to Dublin. Delia Parnell was an active socialite while in Dublin and exposed her children to a wide variety of political views. Anna wrote poetry and painted. In 1865 the family moved to Paris but Anna felt stifled by upper class society rules imposed upon her. She was in Paris when the Franco-Prussian War broke out in 1870 and was active in the American Ladies' Committee fundraising and setting up hospitals. Returning to Dublin, she enrolled in the School of Art of the Royal Dublin Society.

Early political activism 
Anna moved to London in 1875 to continue studying art at the South Kensington School of Design. Parnell was initially success at art, but she did not pursue a career as a painter, and her known paintings are in private collections in Ireland. When her brother Charles was elected as an MP for Meath, Anna became increasingly political. She frequently visited Parliament during debates, sitting in the Ladies' Gallery. She wrote articles about the debates in a column titled Notes From the Ladies' Cage in the Celtic Monthly. In 1879 Anna joined her sister, Fanny Parnell (1848–1882), a poet, in New York where they raised money in support of the Irish National Land League. The sisters worked closely with their brother Charles and Michael Davitt but were critical of how the funds raised in America were being used in Ireland. In October 1880 the sisters founded the New York Ladies' Land League with their mother as president.

Ladies' Land League
Anna returned in Dublin in late 1880. When it seemed that the Land League men were likely to be arrested, it was suggested that a women's league in Ireland could take over the work in their absence. Public opinion at the time was against women in politics, but the Ladies' Land League was founded on 31 January 1881 with Anna as its effective leader.

When Charles Parnell and other leaders were imprisoned in 1881, as predicted, the Ladies' Land League took over their work. Though it was envisioned as a place holder until the men were released, Anna organised branches throughout Ireland, encouraging women to play an active role in Land League activities. Offices were given to the ladies but little help. They raised funds for the League and for the support of prisoners and their families. They distributed Land League wooden huts to shelter evicted tenant families and by the beginning of 1882 they had 500 branches, thousands of women members and considerable publicity.  They distributed  in relief aid. The League was proclaimed an illegal organisation in December 1881, with a last mass meeting on 1 January 1882.

This put the Ladies' Land League in serious debt. Anna approached Charles, requesting money to settle the debts. Charles, who distrusted Anna's understanding of politics, agreed to provide the money under the condition that the Ladies' Land League be disbanded. Anna agreed, disbanding in 1882, but she never forgave Charles and never spoke to him again.

Andrew Kettle stated that Anna had "a better knowledge of the social and political forces of Ireland than any person, man or woman, I have ever met. She would have worked the Land League revolution to a much better conclusion than her great brother".

Later life

After her brother's death in 1891 Anna lived the rest of her life in the south of England. She remained friends with former members of the League, and continued to have an interest in Irish affairs. She supported Helen Taylor's successful campaign to run for parliament in 1885. She relied on the small but unreliable annuity from her brother, John Howard Parnell. She was able to supplement her income with the publication of her volume of poetry, Old tales and new (1905). She wrote an angry account of her Land League experiences in Tale of a Great Sham, in reaction to Davitt's Fall of feudalism (1904), but it was not published until 1986. She made one last political appearance when she campaigned for a Sinn Féin candidate in a 1908 by-election. She made plans for the publication of Tale of a Great Sham in the journal of Inghinidhe na hÉireann, Bean na hÉireann. She paid the fine that the editor, Helena Molony, received fro protesting the royal visit in 1911 to ensure that Molony could continue to work.

Parnell received a small inheritance from her mother's estate in 1910, and moved to Ilfracombe, Devon living under the assumed name Cerisa Palmer. She accidentally drowned at Ilfracombe on 20 September 1911 at the age of 59 while swimming at the Tunnels open-air baths. She was buried in Holy Trinity churchyard on 23 September. Shortly after her death, a former member of the Children's Land League, JP Dunne, called for Parnell to be repatriated for burial in Glasnevin Cemetery, Dublin. The manuscript of Tale of a Great Sham is held in the National Library of Ireland.

Commemoration 
In September 2021, 110 years after her death, Anna Parnell was honoured with a blue plaque on the Allied Irish Bank wall at the top of O’Connell Street, in Dublin city centre, the site of the Ladies Land League which she founded with her sister Fanny in 1881. Historian Margaret Ward has called for Parnell's body to be repatriated to Ireland.

External links

7 BIOGRAPHIES at www.scoilnet.ie

References

Further reading
 Patricia Groves, Petticoat Rebellion – The Anna Parnell Story, Mercier Press , Cork, 2009.
 A. Parnell, Tale of a Great Sham, Dublin, 1986.
 Jane Côté, Fanny and Anna Parnell: Ireland's patriot sisters, Gill and Macmillan Publishers, Dublin, 1991.
 Jane Côté & Dana Hearne, Anna Parnell in Mary Cullen & Maria Luddy (eds.)
 Women, power and consciousness, Dublin, 1995
 Danae O'Regan, Anna and Fanny Parnell in History Ireland, Spring 1999.
 Margaret Ward, Unmanageable Revolutionaries: women and Irish nationalism, Pluto Press, London, 1983

1852 births
1911 deaths
Accidental deaths in England
Deaths by drowning in the United Kingdom
Irish activists
Irish women activists
People from County Wicklow